Elkhorn Park is a neighborhood in northern Lexington, Kentucky, United States. Its boundaries are Dover Road to the north, North Broadway to the east, New Circle Road to the south, and Russell Cave Road to the west.

Neighborhood statistics
 Area: 
 Population: 395
 Population density: 1,716 people per square mile
 Median household income: $55,204

References

Neighborhoods in Lexington, Kentucky